William McClintock (born 1 January 1997) is an Irish cricketer. McClintock made his international debut for the Ireland cricket team in September 2021.

Biography
He made his Twenty20 cricket debut for North West Warriors in the 2017 Inter-Provincial Trophy on 26 May 2017. Prior to his Twenty20 debut, he was part of Ireland's squad for the 2016 Under-19 Cricket World Cup. He made his List A debut for North West Warriors in the 2017 Inter-Provincial Cup on 2 July 2017.

In June 2021, McClintock was named in Ireland's Twenty20 International (T20I) squad for their series against South Africa. In August 2021, McClintock was again named in Ireland's T20I squad, this time for their series against Zimbabwe. McClintock made his T20I debut on 1 September 2021, for Ireland against Zimbabwe.

References

External links
 

1997 births
Living people
Irish cricketers
Ireland Twenty20 International cricketers
North West Warriors cricketers
Place of birth missing (living people)